The Once and Future Liberal: After Identity Politics is a 2017 book by humanities professor Mark Lilla, in which the author argues for U.S. liberals to emphasize commonalities as citizens in their politics, rather than differences of identity.

References

External links 

 

2017 non-fiction books
American non-fiction books
Books about liberalism
Books about politics of the United States
English-language books
Identity politics in the United States
HarperCollins books